Aq Gonbaz is a village in Samangan Province, in northern Afghanistan. It is located in the northern part of Samangan Province and lies in a dry, wide valley. Aq Gonbaz is accessed via a dirt track east of the A76 highway, to the northeast of Hazrat e Soltan.

See also
 Samangan Province

References

External links
Maplandia World Gazetteer

Populated places in Samangan Province